San Francisco Solano is a city in Buenos Aires Province, Argentina. It forms part of the Greater Buenos Aires agglomeration. It is divided between the Quilmes and Almirante Brown partidos.

History
 17 February 1173, the Franciscan convent of Buenos Aires buys territory in the area but sells it in 1871
 1948, the territory is subdivided into plots and sold by the provincial administration
 1949, the settlement is officially founded with the name of San Francisco Solano, despite a council resolution to name the settlement after Paulino Barreiro, a Buenos Aires-born judge assassinated in 1840
 12 October 1981, the settlement is officially declared a city

Name
The city is named after Spanish missionary St. Francisco Solano (10 March 1549 – 14 July 1610).

Population
There are 53,363 inhabitants who live in the Quilmes-administered part of the city and 28,344 inhabitants in Almirante Brown partido.

External links
 Solano-OnLine

Populated places in Buenos Aires Province
Populated places established in 1949
Almirante Brown Partido
Quilmes Partido
Cities in Argentina